Shahadat Hossain Chowdhury (died on 29 November 2021) was a Bangladesh Nationalist Party politician and a Jatiya Sangsad member representing the Chittagong-12 constituency during 1979–1986.

References

20th-century births
2021 deaths
Bangladesh Nationalist Party politicians
2nd Jatiya Sangsad members
People from Chittagong District
Year of birth missing
Place of birth missing